Winnisquam is an unincorporated community in the Lakes Region of New Hampshire, United States.

Winnisquam has a ZIP code of 03289, different from the ZIP codes in each of its component towns.

References

Unincorporated communities in Belknap County, New Hampshire
Unincorporated communities in New Hampshire
New Hampshire placenames of Native American origin